Dubois Creek is a stream in  Franklin County in the U.S. state of Missouri. It is a tributary to the Missouri River.

The stream source area is along the east side of Missouri Route A between Union and Krakow. The stream flows northeast passing under Route 47 and then north passing under Route 100 to enter the Missouri floodplain just east of Washington.

Dubois Creek most likely was named after Louis Dubois, an early French frontiersman.

See also
List of rivers of Missouri

References

Rivers of Franklin County, Missouri
Rivers of Missouri